The 32nd Zagorje Division (Serbo-Croatian Latin: Tridesetdruga zagorska divizija) was a Yugoslav Partisan division formed on 12 December 1943 on Kalnik mountain. It was formed from Radić Brothers Brigade and Matija Gubec Brigade which had a total of 1,764 fighters. The division was commanded by Izidor Štrok while its political commissar was Ivan Rabić. The division mostly operated in Croatia proper.

References 

Divisions of the Yugoslav Partisans
Military units and formations established in 1943